The Normals were a Christian alternative rock band formed in 1998 by Andrew Osenga, Mark Lockett, and Clayton Daily. The name of the band honors their hometown of Normal, Illinois. The band's lineup also included B.J. Aberle, Cason Cooley, Mike Taquino, and Steve Hindalong. The Normals released three albums with ForeFront Records and garnered two GMA Dove Award nominations before disbanding in 2002.

Discography 

Better Than This (1998)
Coming to Life (2000)
A Place Where You Belong (2002)

References

External links

cMusicWeb.com interview

Alternative rock groups from Illinois
Christian rock groups from Illinois
Musical groups established in 1998